Robinsonia multimaculata is a moth in the family Erebidae. It was described by Walter Rothschild in 1909. It is found in south-eastern Peru, Carabaya and Santo Domingo.

References

Moths described in 1909
Robinsonia (moth)